Leiocolea rutheana is a species of liverwort belonging to the family Jungermanniaceae.

It is native to Europe and Northern America.

References

Jungermanniales